Anopheles kleini is a species of mosquito. It is found in South Korea.  The species name honors US Army Colonel Terry A. Klein, medical entomologist, for his numerous contributions to mosquito research in Asia.

References

kleini
Insects described in 2005